The 1919 SMU Mustangs football team was an American football team that represented Southern Methodist University (SMU) as a member of the Southwest Conference (SWC) during the 1919 college football season. In its third season under head coach J. Burton Rix, the team compiled an overall record of 5–4–1 record with a mark of 0–2–1 in conference play, placing sixth in the SWC. The Mustangs were outscored by a total of 162 to 86 on the season.

Schedule

References

SMU
SMU Mustangs football seasons
SMU Mustangs football